Yureshka Anjana de Silva (born 3 March 1997) is a Sri Lankan cricketer. He made his List A debut for Badureliya Sports Club in the 2017–18 Premier Limited Overs Tournament on 10 March 2018. He made his Twenty20 debut on 8 January 2020, for Sri Lanka Ports Authority Cricket Club in the 2019–20 SLC Twenty20 Tournament.

References

External links
 

1997 births
Living people
Sri Lankan cricketers
Badureliya Sports Club cricketers
Sri Lanka Ports Authority Cricket Club cricketers
Place of birth missing (living people)